USS LST-573 was a United States Navy  used in the Asiatic-Pacific Theater during World War II.

Construction and commissioning
LST-573 was laid down on 15 April 1944 at Evansville, Indiana, by the Missouri Valley Bridge and Iron Company. She was launched on 31 May 1944, sponsored by Mrs. Ernest C. Strpebe, and commissioned on 21 June 1944.

Service history
During the war, LST-573 was assigned to the Pacific Theater of Operations. She took part in the Philippines campaign, participating in the Battle of Leyte landing in October and November 1944, the Battle of Mindoro in December 1944, the Battle of Mindanao in March 1945, and the Battle of the Visayas in March and April 1945.
 
Following the war, LST-573 performed occupation duty in the Far East until mid-January 1946. Upon her return to the United States, she was decommissioned on 24 January 1946 and struck from the Navy list on 31 October 1947. On 26 May 1948, the ship was sold to the Bethlehem Steel Co., of Bethlehem, Pennsylvania.

Honors and awards
LST-573 earned three battle stars for her World War II service.

Notes
Citations

Bibliography
Online sources

External links

LST-542-class tank landing ships
World War II amphibious warfare vessels of the United States
Ships built in Evansville, Indiana
1944 ships